Małgorzata Łupina (born 17 October 1969 in Olsztyn) is a Polish documentary film director and cameraman. She graduated from the National Film School in Łódź (PWSFTViT) in 1995.

Selected filmography

 2010 - Zapaśniczka z Boliwii - director, producer
 2006 - Dudi (also an animated sequence Dłuży się doży) - director, script, photography
 2002 - O czym marzą tygrysy - photography
 2002 - Marzyć każdy może - director, script, photography
 2002 -  - director
 1997 - Kirk Douglas. 30 lat później - photography
 1995 - Viola... Viola - director, script, photography
 1995 - Kotek - photography

External links
 Official website of Małgorzata Łupina
 Małgorzata Łupina at the Polish Internet Movie Database
 

1969 births
Łódź Film School alumni
Polish film directors
Polish women film directors
Film people from Łódź
Living people